"Moves" is a song performed by English singer Olly Murs, featuring vocals from American rapper and record producer Snoop Dogg. The song was released as a digital download on 28 September 2018 as the lead single from his sixth studio album You Know I Know. The song also features on the Johnny English Strikes Again OST. It was written by Ed Sheeran, Steve Mac, Ammar Malik and Snoop Dogg.

Background 
The song is similar to "Feels", by Calvin Harris.

This is the second time that Ed Sheeran has written a song for Murs. The first was "Love Shine Down", a track on Murs' self-titled debut album.

Critical reception 
Michael Cragg of The Guardian derided the track, joking that "it's dominated by two things: Ed Sheeran, who co-wrote it, likely demoed it and then emailed it over as willthisdo.mp3; and Snoop Dogg, who was no one's first choice and has literally no idea what's going on".

Music video
A music video to accompany the release of "Moves" was first released onto YouTube on 17 October 2018. It features Murs sneaking into a nightclub with friends while competing in a dance battle.

Rowan Atkinson appears as a bartender serving Murs energy drinks. Snoop Dogg is heard but not seen as he was unable to attend the filming of the video.

Elsie Hewitt an English Supermodel / Actress is also in the said music video.

Live performances
 The X Factor (11 November 2018) featuring Lady Leshurr instead of Snoop Dogg.

Track listing

Charts

Weekly charts

Year-end charts

Certifications

Release history

References

2018 songs
2018 singles
Olly Murs songs
Songs about dancing
Song recordings produced by Steve Mac
Songs written by Ed Sheeran
Songs written by Ammar Malik
Songs written by Snoop Dogg
Songs written by Steve Mac